Wallace Joseph Campodonico (April 23, 1923 – January 14, 2023), better known as Wally Campo, was an American actor. He was known for his appearances in Roger Corman and Burt Topper films, as well as for narrating The Little Shop of Horrors (1960).

Life and career
Wallace Campodonico was born in Stockton, California on April 23, 1923. He attended Stockton High School, and played the title role in the 1941 senior class production of Tom Cobb or, Fortune's Toy. During World War II, Campodonico served in the U.S. Army, enlisting in June 1942. After the war, he worked as a stage actor. He appeared in a 1948 production of Ah, Wilderness! as part of The Stockton Community Players.

Campo's best known appearance on screen was playing Joe Fink in The Little Shop of Horrors (1960), a detective who visits the shop after catching wind of recent disappearances. The character's persona has been described as a parody of the type of detectives featured in Dragnet. Campo also narrated the film.

In 1969, Campo, then working as an acting coach, made his debut as a director on the film Mark of the Gun, starring Ross Hagen.

Campo and his wife, Geraldine Matthews, had one son, Tony Campodonico, a musician who appeared as a child actor on General Hospital. He later lived in Valley Village, Los Angeles, and died in the Studio City neighborhood of Los Angeles on January 14, 2023, at the age of 99.

Filmography

References

External links

1923 births
2023 deaths
20th-century American actors
Actors from California
American film actors
Military personnel from California
People from Stockton, California